The Macquarie Street Gatehouse at the Macquarie Street entrance of Parramatta Park in Parramatta, New South Wales, Australia, is a building of historical significance and is listed on the Heritage Register. It dates back to 1848, when the first gatehouse was built following the death of Lady Mary Fitzroy. The present house, which was largely constructed in 1887, was built around this original dwelling. The building was designed as a gatekeeper's cottage, with a separate room set aside for the use of the Parramatta Park Trust. It is a typical example of High Victorian Gothic architecture, which was very popular at that time. Today the house is used as a café.

Early history

The original building was constructed in 1848, immediately after a tragic accident to the wife of Governor Sir Charles Fitzroy, who was then living in Government House. Governor Fitzroy and his wife, Lady Mary, accompanied by Lieutenant Charles Masters, were on their way to a wedding when the horses bolted soon after leaving the house and their carriage overturned near the entrance in George Street. Sir Charles was not seriously injured, but both Lady Mary and Lieutenant Masters were killed. A full account of the accident was given in the newspaper Bell's Life. A memorial obelisk commemorates their deaths at the site of the tree where the accident occurred.

Sir Charles was deeply affected by the tragedy, and he felt he could not bear to use the George Street entrance again, so he arranged for the construction of the Macquarie Street gatehouse. The following month, in January 1848, a newspaper made the following report:

This was a new gateway with a small cottage for the gatekeeper. This cottage subsequently became the present gatehouse when major alterations and additions were made to it in 1887 by the Parramatta Park Trust.

The Reilly family

The first gatekeeper in the new 1887 Victorian cottage was Mrs Bridget Reilly (often misspelt Riley), who had been recently widowed. It was not unusual for the Parramatta Park Trust to appoint ladies to this role, as the Sands Directory for 1905 shows that three of the gatekeepers in the park were women. The duties of the gatekeepers were to open the gates in the morning and close them at dusk. They were also responsible for keeping within the park the cows and horses for whom the park trust received adjustment fees. There were sometimes disagreements about this duty, which were described in a newspaper. The gatekeepers also provided hot water at a small charge to picnickers who wished to make some tea.

Mrs Bridget Reilly (née Lynch) was born in Ireland in 1830. She came to Australia as an assisted immigrant at the age of 23 after her parents James and Catherine Lynch died. She arrived in Sydney on the ship Telegraph and found employment as a general servant. In 1857 she married William Reilly (1826–1887) in Parramatta. The couple had three children: Ellen (born 1861), Mary Ann (born 1862) and William Edmund (born 1864), who was one of the first pupils enrolled in 1875 in the newly opened Parramatta Marist High School.

Bridget's husband William died in 1887, and soon afterward she was offered the position of gatekeeper. She moved with her three adult children into the Macquarie Street gatehouse in the same year. Mary Ann became a dressmaker, and William Edmund became a plumber. They both continued to live at the gatehouse with their mother Bridget until she died in 1916.

After Bridget died, her daughter Mary Ann became the gatekeeper. In 1917 there was a newspaper report about the part that Mary Ann played, in her role as gatekeeper, in finding a lost child. She and her sister Ellen (who was an invalid) did not marry, and they both lived in the gatehouse until she retired in about 1927. They then moved to a house in Sorrell Street, Parramatta, where they lived for the rest of their lives. They were buried with their parents in Rookwood Cemetery.

Sarah Jane Restall
Mrs Sarah Jane Restall became the gatekeeper about 1927, shortly after her husband Robert Restall (1872–1927) died. He had lived and worked in Parramatta Park for several years, probably as a general labourer.

Sarah was born in Brighton, England, in 1864, and she married Robert in 1895 on Portsea Island in Hampshire. The couple lived for some time in Horsham with Frederick George, a child Sarah had borne previously. In 1907, at the age of 25, Frederick decided to emigrate to Australia, and several years later Sarah and Robert followed him. Eventually they came to Sydney, and Robert found employment and accommodation in Parramatta Park.

After Robert's death in 1927, Sarah lived at the Macquarie Street gatehouse for several years. Then, in 1932, she met Anton Dietmair, and they decided to marry. On the eve of their wedding, her friends held a surprise party in her home which was described in the local newspaper in the following terms:

The marriage, however, was not a success, and several years later Sarah obtained a divorce. She continued to live in Parramatta until she married again in 1941. Her husband was George Henry Wadsworth, who came from Victoria. After he died, she returned to Parramatta and lived there for the rest of her life. She died in 1945 at the age of 81 and is buried in Rookwood Cemetery.

The Harvey family

Charles Herbert Harvey became gatekeeper about 1934, soon after his retirement from the army. He had previously been a Warrant Officer at the Parramatta Lancer Barracks. Charles was born in 1879 in St Leonards, Sydney. In 1899 he married in Paddington Isobel Mabel McCallum, who was born in New Zealand. He went to Sydney University and became a laboratory assistant at the medical Sshool. In 1899 he served in the Boer War. Then, in 1910, he joined the military forces and fought in World War I. He remained in the army until his retirement in 1931.

The couple lived in Parramatta for most of their married lives and were involved in community affairs. Charles joined the Parramatta Musical and Dramatic Society and assisted with the production of their many theatrical events. He also joined the Parramatta Bowling Club, which at that time was located next to the gatehouse. He became Secretary of the club in 1932 and remained in this position for almost fifteen years. He died in 1952 and was buried at the Northern Suburbs Crematorium. The Electoral Roll shows that Isobel, his wife, continued to live at the gatehouse until about 1960 and then moved to Pennant Hills Rd in Parramatta. She died in 1978 at the age of 97.

The gatehouse today
The building today is called the Gatehouse Tea Rooms and serves high teas, light meals and other beverages, including wine.

Description
The cottage is a two storey Gothic style brick structure stuccoed and painted to represent standard 610 x 305mm stone jointing. There are three original downstairs residential rooms comprising a living room with bay windows and french doors opening onto the east verandah, kitchen (with a fuel stove still in place), and a third room presumed to be a dining room, all connected by a hall leading from the entry portico on the north elevation of the building. The trust meeting room was entered from a separate lobby centrally located in the symmetrical eastern façade. The trust meeting room has a set of french doors opening onto the verandah, balancing the living room doors. Upstairs the house provides three bedrooms within the rake of the roof.

These low ceiling spaces were finished with board linings and in general the finishes and details are less elaborate than the more public spaces such as the living room and trust meeting room. The roof is purple grey slates with inset lighter coloured slate diamond shapes in the east face and both sides of the central gable to the verandah. The three chimneys have elaborate rendered mouldings and triangular pediment forms to the four faces at the top. The east verandah and north portico are constructed in heavily moulded timber with extensive use of small struts and brackets at post to beam connections typical of domestic gothic timber detailing. A feature of the external joinery work is the repetitive use of stop chamfers on beams, posts and struts.

Heritage listing
The Macquarie Street Gatehouse derives its significance from its association with the Park, its function as a gatekeeper's cottage and its association with the Parramatta Park Trustees. The building was designed as a gate keepers cottage with a separate room set aside for the use of the Parramatta Park Trust. The historic visual relationship between the cottage and the town centre created by the vista along Macquarie Street is of cultural significance.  As a group, the Parramatta Park gatehouses are of state significance for their archaeological, architectural, social and landscape values.

References

External links
 Gatehouse Tea Rooms website

Victorian architecture in Sydney
Houses in Parramatta
Houses completed in 1848
1848 establishments in Australia